José Luis Sánchez Moretti (born 9 January 1970) is a Chilean former professional footballer who played as a forward.

Club career
In Chile, he also played for Provincial Osorno, Deportes La Serena, Universidad de Chile, Deportes Iquique and Deportes Puerto Montt. Along with Unión Española, he won the 1993 Copa Chile, scoring 11 goals.

Along with Vélez Sarsfield, he won the 1994 Intercontinental Cup.

In 1999, he joined Unión Española in the Primera B, winning the championship and returning to the Chilean Primera División.

In other countries, he played for Granada in Spain, both Bari and Pisa in Italy and Locarno in Switzerland.

International career
In 1992, Sánchez represented Chile at under-23 level in the Pre-Olympic Tournament. At senior level, he took part of the Chile squad in the friendly match versus Spain on 8 September 1993, but he didn't play.

Coaching career
From 2013 to 2021, he worked in the Unión Española youth system, mainly at the under-14 and under-16 levels.

Personal life
He was nicknamed Matador, later Mata'or, like the Spanish bullfighters.

Honours
Lozapenco
 Tercera División de Chile (1): 

Unión Española
 Primera B de Chile (1): 1999
 Copa Chile (1): 1993

Vélez Sarsfield
 Argentine Primera División (1): 1995 Apertura
 Copa Libertadores (1): 1994
 Intercontinental Cup (1): 1994

References

External links
 
 
 José Luis Sánchez at PlaymakerStats

1970 births
Living people
Chilean people of Italian descent
Footballers from Santiago
Chilean footballers
Chile youth international footballers
Chilean expatriate footballers
Unión Española footballers
Provincial Osorno footballers
Deportes La Serena footballers
Club Atlético Vélez Sarsfield footballers
Universidad de Chile footballers
Granada CF footballers
Deportes Iquique footballers
Puerto Montt footballers
S.S.C. Bari players
Pisa S.C. players
FC Locarno players
Chilean Primera División players
Tercera División de Chile players
Argentine Primera División players
Segunda División B players
Primera B de Chile players
Serie A players
Serie C players
Swiss Challenge League players
Chilean expatriate sportspeople in Argentina
Chilean expatriate sportspeople in Spain
Chilean expatriate sportspeople in Italy
Chilean expatriate sportspeople in Switzerland
Expatriate footballers in Argentina
Expatriate footballers in Spain
Expatriate footballers in Italy
Expatriate footballers in Switzerland
Association football forwards
Chilean football managers